Mirko Boman (11 December 1926 – 30 August 2013) was a Croatian actor. He appeared in more than fifty films from 1959 to 2002.

Selected filmography

References

External links 

1926 births
2013 deaths
Male actors from Zagreb
Croatian male film actors